Dumoulin is a surname of French origin.

Dumoulin may also refer to:
 Dumoulin Islands, Antarctica
 Dumoulin Islands (Louisiade), Papua New Guinea
 Dumoulin Rocks, Antarctica

See also
 McCormick v Fasken Martineau DuMoulin LLP, a 2014 decision of the US Supreme Court relating to partnership and employment